Village Fête (or in Fr. La Fête villageoise) is an oil-on-canvas by French artist of the Baroque Claude Lorrain (real name Claude Gellée), painted in 1639 and given to Louis XIV in 1693 together with its companion Seaport at Sunset, by landscape architect and gardener André Le Nôtre.  It is currently held and exhibited at the Louvre in Paris.

History
Claude's Liber Veritatis, a register in which he recorded and drew the paintings he had done, has a note on the back of the drawing for the  Fête (No. 13) that the picture had been painted for Urban VIII. Other sources also state that the artist painted a Village Fête and a Seaport at Sunset for Urban VIII, but these two paintings were sold by Prince Barberini in 1798. The Louvre painting must therefore be a replica painted by Claude Lorrain after the lost original. Another copy dated 1669 was in the possession of Lord Yarborough in England, and yet another in the Stroganovs collection, St. Petersburg. Several other replicas and copies exist.

This particular painting, painted fairly early in the artist's career, reveals the influence of Flemish art. The composition, with a group of trees in the centre, and openings on either side through which the light appears, was often used by Flemish landscape painters from the time of Bruegel: Paul and Matthew Bril frequently employed it, and Lorrain continued in their tradition in Rome. In accordance with classic 16th century procedure, the bridge harmoniously unites the middle and far distance. Through the opening on the right can be seen a city bathed in a golden mist, more characteristic of the campagna romana (Roman countryside) than of the North. Following the usual practice of studios of the Low Countries, Lorrain often employed other artists to paint the little figures in his pictures; but this does not seem to have been the case here, to judge by the unity of conception between figures and landscape.

See also
Black mirror
Landscape art
Lost artworks

Further reading
Dullea, Owen J., Claude Gellée de Lorrain, New York, Scribner and Wellford, 1887.
Chiarini, Marco. Claude Lorrain – Selected Drawings. Pennsylvania State University Press, 1968.
Michael Kitson, Claude Lorrain, Liber veritatis (British Museum Publications, London, 1978) 
Russell, H. Diane, Claude Lorrain, 1600–1682, New York, George Braziller, 1982.
Lagerlöf, Margaretha Rossholm, Ideal Landscape: Annibale Carracci, Nicolas Poussin and Claude Lorrain, New Haven, Yale University Press, 1990.
Sonnabend, Martin, Whiteley, Jon, Ruemelin, Christian, Claude Lorrain: The Enchanted Landscape, Lund Humphries (2011).

References

External links
La Fête villageoise at the Louvre
Claude's Biography, Context and Artworks
National Gallery
www.ClaudeLorrain.org 149 works by Claude Lorrain
Web Gallery of Art

 Sterling and Francine Clark Art Institute 2007 exhibition, Claude Lorrain: The Painter as Draftsman

Landscape artists
1639 paintings
Paintings in the Louvre by French artists
Paintings by Claude Lorrain
Horses in art